This a list of the Spanish PROMUSICAE Top 20 physical Singles number-ones of 2008.

See also 
2008 in music
List of number-one hits in Spain

References

Number-one singles
Spain Singles
2008